Homeobox protein Hox-B13 is a protein that in humans is encoded by the HOXB13 gene.

Function 

This gene encodes a transcription factor that belongs to the homeobox gene family. Genes of this family are highly conserved among vertebrates and essential for vertebrate embryonic development. This gene has been implicated in fetal skin development and cutaneous regeneration. In mice, a similar gene was shown to exhibit temporal and spatial colinearity in the main body axis of the embryo, but was not expressed in the secondary axes, which suggests functions in body patterning along the axis. This gene and other HOXB genes form a gene cluster on chromosome 17 in the 17q21-22 region.
Men who inherit a rare (<0.1% in a selected group of patients without clinical signs of prostate cancer) genetic variant in HOXB13 (G84E or rs138213197) have a 10-20-fold increased risk of prostate cancer.

See also 
 Homeobox

References

Further reading

External links 
 
 

Transcription factors